The School of Medicine, Walailak University is a medical school in Tha Sala District, Nakhon Si Thammarat Province.

History 
In 2004, by support from the citizens of Nakhon Si Thammarat Province, a project to improve healthcare in the province was proposed to the cabinet. On 11 March 2006, the Walailak University Council, along with the Collaborative Project to Increase Production of Rural Doctor (CPIRD), the Ministry of Public Health (MOPH), the school of Medicine was set up and the Doctor of Medicine degree was approved by the Medical Council of Thailand. On 27 November 2006, the school made an agreement with the Faculty of Medicine, Chulalongkorn University for it to act as a mentoring institution for the school. The school was officially opened on 24 September 2007, initially opening admission for 48 students from Nakhon Si Thammarat, Trang and Phuket Provinces only, for the 2008 academic year. This quota was extended to Krabi and Phang-Nga Provinces in the 2015 academic year.

Teaching Hospitals 

 Walailak University Hospital
Vachira Phuket Hospital (CPIRD)
 Trang Hospital (CPIRD)

See also 

 List of medical schools in Thailand

References 

 
Article incorporates material from the corresponding article in the Thai wikipedia.

Medical schools in Thailand
University departments in Thailand